Jamia Nazmia is one of the leading centres of Shia Islamic education in the city of Lucknow, India. It was founded on the 8th Jamadi-ul-Awwal 1308 Hijri (2 February 1890) making it the oldest Shia religious institution of India.

Jamia Nazmia was established by the late and revered scholar Ayatullah Syed Najmul Hasan. Syed Abul Hasan Rizvi, also known as Ibbu Sahib, influenced Nawab Abbas Ali Khan to donate some land to the madrasa.

Administration
The current principal Ayatollah Syed Hamidul Hasan has been working with the institution since 1969, after his return from Najaf where he went for religious studies. Maulana Syed Faridul Hasan, son of Ayatollah Syed Hamidul Hasan, is the principal of Nazmia Arabic College - the government-funded part of the Madrasa.

Some teachers at Jamia Nazmia include Maulana Syed Rasool Ahmad Rizvi, Maulana Syed Ayyub, Maulana Syed Shahenshah, Maulana Syed Mohammad Shakir Naqvi, Maulana Syed Ibne Haider, Maulana Mehmood Ahmad, Maulana Mohd Mujtaba Husain, Maulana Syed Shahenshah Husain, Maulana Syed Mohd Ghafir Baqarai, Maulana Murtuza Parvi, and Maulana Syed Mohammad Afzaal Naqvi. Taqi Raza (ex-professor at Mahanagar Boys College) is the president of the Managing Committee of Nazmia.

Courses
The basic education, including Hindi and English, offered by the madrasa is of nine years. Higher education is of 10 years. It includes Persian and Arabic education imparted, as per the Arabic and Persian Board of the UP Government, by the Nazmia Arabic College.

In the lower classes, mark sheets and certificates are issued. Diploma and Degrees are awarded under Munshi, Maulvi, Kamil, Alim, Qabil, Fazil, and Mumtazul-Afazil.

Syllabus is the combination of the experiences of past and present learned ulamas with modern touches, it includes, Aqaid, Diniyaat, Qurn, Urdu, Hindi, English, Mathematics, Geography, Science, Arabic, Persian, Mantiq, Philosophy, Hait, Urooz, Kalam, Ma-ani-wa-Bayan, History, Tafseer, Hadees wa Usool-e-Hadees, Fiqh wa Usool-e-Fiqh. Computer education is also imparted according to the present requirement and will be extended in near future. There is also a scheme to modernise the education of junior classes.

Facilities

Free of cost education is provided by the college. Outstation students are given free food and lodging facility in the college hostels. Students can also borrow course books from the college. Successful students with good result are also rewarded with scholarships.

In addition there is a building named Haidary Hostel ('Daarul Aqama') to accommodate the families of teachers.

The madrasa has its own spacious library with good collection of books and a dedicated computer room.

A two-story mosque on the campus is used for prayers.

See also
 Madrasatul Waizeen
 Jamia Nazmia
 Sultanul Madaris, another madrasa in Lucknow that works hand-in-hand with Jamia Nazmia.
 Tanzeemul Makatib
Jamiya Imamia at Lucknow, Uttar Pradesh
Jameatuz Zahra at Lucknow
Madrasa Khadeejatul Kubra at Lucknow
 Jamia Imania, Varanasi
 Jami'ul Uloom Jawadia, Prahladghat, Varanasi
 Hoza-e-Ilmiya Wasiqa, Faizabad
 Babul Ilm, Mubarakpur, Azamgarh
 Jamia Haidariya, Khairabad Mau
The renowned king of qaseeda-FARAZDAQA-E-HIND-ALLAM QAIS ZANGIPURI-ia an alumni-a student of JAMIA NAZMIA

References

External links
A small video of the madrasa with its history on audio
Official website of Jamia-e-Nazmia

Islam in India
Education in Lucknow